Perissodus eccentricus is a species of cichlid endemic to Lake Tanganyika where it is only known from Zambian waters.  It feeds on the scales of other fishes.  This species can reach a length of  SL.  This species can also be found in the aquarium trade.

References

Fauna of Zambia
Perissodus
Endemic fauna of Zambia
Fish described in 1976
Taxonomy articles created by Polbot